Carl Smith is a game designer who has worked primary on role-playing games.

Career
Carl Smith was an editor at TSR when Tracy Hickman got Harold Johnson, then Jeff Grubb, Smith and Larry Elmore in on the idea of Dragonlance before Margaret Weis and Douglas Niles joined them.

Between 1983 and 1984, approximately 200 people left TSR as a result of multiple rounds of layoffs; as a result Smith joined CEO John Rickets, as well as Mark Acres, Andria Hayday, Gaye Goldsberry O'Keefe, Gali Sanchez, Garry Spiegle, Stephen D. Sullivan and Michael Williams in forming the game company Pacesetter on January 23, 1984. In 1985, Smith announced that Pacesetter was developing a "totally new concept in gaming", that he referred to as the "instant adventure roleplaying game"; this project was published in the summer as Sandman: Map of Halaal (1985).

References

External links

Dungeons & Dragons game designers
Living people
Place of birth missing (living people)
Year of birth missing (living people)